Debaun-Demarest House is located in River Edge, Bergen County, New Jersey, United States. The house was added to the National Register of Historic Places on January 10, 1983.

See also
National Register of Historic Places listings in Bergen County, New Jersey

References

Houses on the National Register of Historic Places in New Jersey
Houses in Bergen County, New Jersey
National Register of Historic Places in Bergen County, New Jersey
River Edge, New Jersey
New Jersey Register of Historic Places